Vlada Aleksandrovna Koval (born 11 July 2001) is a Russian tennis player.

Koval has a career-high WTA singles ranking of 339, achieved on 26 July 2021. She also has a career-high WTA doubles ranking of 325, reached on 16 March 2020. Koval has won one singles title and four doubles titles on the ITF Circuit.

On the ITF Junior Circuit, she has a career-high combined ranking of 63, achieved on 30 January 2017.

Koval made her Fed Cup debut for Russia in 2019.

ITF Circuit finals

Singles: 5 (1 title, 4 runner–ups)

Doubles: 9 (5 titles, 4 runner–ups)

Fed Cup/Billie Jean King Cup participation

Doubles (1–0)

References

External links
 
 
 

2001 births
Living people
Russian female tennis players
Sportspeople from Bryansk
21st-century Russian women